Wide Open Spaces is the fourth studio album and the major label debut of American country music band Dixie Chicks. It was their first record with new lead vocalist Natalie Maines, and became their breakthrough commercial success. It received diamond status by the RIAA on February 20, 2003, in the United States, having shipped 13 million units worldwide, while spending more than six years in the Australian ARIA music charts Country Top 20.

"Once You've Loved Somebody" had previously been recorded by John & Audrey Wiggins on their 1996 album, The Dream.

Wide Open Spaces, as well as their next albums Fly (1999) and Home (2002), were released in the HDCD format.

Critical reception 

Upon its release, Wide Open Spaces received favorable reviews from critics. Music critic Robert Christgau gave the album a two-star honorable mention, simply stating that the "blonds have more brains (than they get credit for)." Los Angeles Times wrote that "this tradition-rooted Texas trio knows its way around country, western, honky-tonk, bluegrass, folk and country-rock." Concluding the review, it deemed that the "range, plus their sweet, assured three-part harmonies, Natalie Maines' attractively steely lead vocals, and savvy song selection have propelled this major-label debut into the Top 10."

In a retrospective review by Stephen Thomas Erlewine of AllMusic, he stated that it hit a "sweet spot" and described the album as "appealing to many different audiences" and "eclectic without being elitist." He described Natalie Maines' voice as "powerful" and "bluesy" to "give these songs a compelling center" and "versatile" to "[negotiate] the twists and turns of these songs without a hitch, easily moving from the vulnerability of "You Were Mine" to the snarl of "Give It Up or Let Me Go." Concluding his review, he praised the "remarkably wide range" as "effortlessly eclectic" and the group for "bringing [the album] all together with their attitude and understated musicality."

Track listing

Personnel
Compiled from liner notes.

The Chicks
Natalie Maines – vocals
Emily Erwin – acoustic guitar, banjo, Dobro, vocals
Martie Seidel – fiddle, mandolin, vocals

Additional personnel
Mark Casstevens – acoustic guitar
Bobby Charles, Jr. – bass guitar
Joe Chemay – bass guitar
Billy Crain – acoustic guitar
Lloyd Maines – steel guitar
George Marinelli – electric guitar
Greg Morrow – drums
Tommy Nash – electric guitar on "Give It Up or Let Me Go"
Tony Paoletta – steel guitar on "Give It Up or Let Me Go"
Michael Rhodes – bass guitar
Tom Roady – shaker, congas, tambourine
Matt Rollings – piano, Hammond organ
Billy Joe Walker, Jr. – acoustic guitar, electric guitar
Paul Worley – acoustic guitar, electric guitar

Technical
 Chuck Ainlay - mixing on "Give It Up or Let Me Go"
 Jim Burnett - Pro Tools editing
Blake Chancey - production
 Don Cobb - digital editing
 Carlos Grier - digital editing
 John Guess - mixing
Eric Legg - recording
 Denny Purcell - mastering
Billy Sherrill - recording on "Give It Up or Let Me Go"
 Paul Worley - production

Accolades
At the 41st Grammy Awards, the album was awarded two Grammy Awards out of three nominations. It was awarded Best Country Album (the first of what would be four trophies in this category: they would later win for Fly in 2000, Home in 2003, and Taking the Long Way in 2007) and for Best Country Performance by a Duo or Group with Vocal for the song "There's Your Trouble". This is an award the Chicks would win five times: in 2000 for "Ready to Run", in 2003 for "Long Time Gone", in 2005 for "Top of the World" and 2007 for "Not Ready to Make Nice", a feat only matched by The Judds. In addition, the Chicks were nominated for Best New Artist in 1999.

Charts

Weekly charts

Year-end charts

Decade-end charts

Singles

Other charted songs

Certifications

See also
List of best-selling albums in the United States

References 

The Chicks albums
Monument Records albums
1998 albums
Albums produced by Paul Worley
Albums produced by Blake Chancey
Grammy Award for Best Country Album
Canadian Country Music Association Top Selling Album albums